is a railway station on the Hisatsu Line in Ashikita, Kumamoto, Japan, operated by Kyushu Railway Company (JR Kyushu).

Lines
Yoshio Station is served by the Hisatsu Line.

Layout
The station has a single side platform serving one bi-directional track.

Adjacent stations

See also
 List of railway stations in Japan

External links

  

Railway stations in Kumamoto Prefecture